Caecum cycloferum is a species of minute sea snail, a marine gastropod mollusk or micromollusk in the family Caecidae.

Description

The maximum recorded shell length is 6 mm.

Habitat
Minimum recorded depth is 0 m. Maximum recorded depth is 101 m.

References

Caecidae
Gastropods described in 1867